Courtney Jerome Anderson Sr. (born November 19, 1980) is a former American football tight end. Born in Greenville, Texas, Anderson attended high school in Richmond, California and played college football at Contra Costa College and San Jose State University. He was drafted by the Oakland Raiders in the seventh round of the 2004 NFL Draft and spent three seasons with that team. Later, he was a member of the Miami Dolphins, Detroit Lions, Atlanta Falcons, Buffalo Bills and Houston Texans. He is currently a firefighter for the community of Milpitas, CA.

Early life and college career
Born in Greenville, Texas, Anderson graduated from Richmond High School in California, where he lettered in football, basketball, and track and field. In the football team, Anderson was quarterback, wide receiver, and defensive linebacker in the football team. In 1998, he caught 50 passes for 1,005 yards, scored 12 touchdowns, and earned all-state honors. Anderson was a member of the 1999 Richmond Oilers basketball team coached by Ken Carter that was dramatized in the movie Coach Carter.

For two years, Anderson attended Contra Costa College. In football, he lined up at wide receiver before moving to tight end. He then transferred to San Jose State University where, in 23 games, hauled in 36 passes for 477 yards (13.3 avg.) and seven touchdowns. He also majored in sociology.

Professional career

Oakland Raiders
Anderson was drafted by the Oakland Raiders in the seventh round (245th overall) of the 2004 NFL Draft. In his rookie season, he made 13 catches for 175 yards and one touchdown in nine games (four of which he started); he left Week 9 with an ankle injury. The next season, Anderson played in 14 games, of which he started in 13, and caught 24 passes for 303 yards and three touchdowns. In his three seasons with Oakland, Anderson had 62 receptions for 763 yards and six touchdowns and occasionally caught passes deep midfield. The Raiders released Anderson before the 2007 preseason.

Miami Dolphins
Anderson went to training camp with the Miami Dolphins in 2007 but was released on September 1, 2007.

Detroit Lions
Anderson was signed by the Detroit Lions on September 24, 2007 to replace the injured starter Dan Campbell, whose starting position was taken by Sean McHugh. He played two games with the Lions and then was cut on October 28, 2007.

Atlanta Falcons
The Atlanta Falcons claimed Anderson off waivers on November 13, 2007 from the Lions.

Buffalo Bills
Anderson signed with the Buffalo Bills on March 10, 2008,  but was released on August 30 during final cuts.

Houston Texans
After spending the 2008 regular season out of football, Anderson was signed to a future contract by the Houston Texans on January 5, 2009.  He was waived by the team on April 30.

References

External links
San Jose State Spartans bio

1980 births
Living people
African-American players of American football
American football tight ends
Atlanta Falcons players
Buffalo Bills players
Contra Costa Comets football players
Detroit Lions players
Houston Texans players
Miami Dolphins players
Oakland Raiders players
People from Greenville, Texas
Sportspeople from Richmond, California
Players of American football from California
Players of American football from Texas
San Jose State Spartans football players
Sportspeople from the Dallas–Fort Worth metroplex
Richmond High School (Richmond, California) alumni
21st-century African-American sportspeople
20th-century African-American people